Li Jiaqi is the name of:

Li Jiaqi (figure skater) (born 1990), Chinese figure skater
Li Jiaqi (footballer) (born 1991), Chinese association footballer
Li Jiaqi (cyclist) (born 1995/6), Chinese cyclist
Li Jiaqi (field hockey) (born 1995), Chinese field hockey player
Li Jiaqi (beauty influencer) (born 1992), Chinese cosmetics influencer and entrepreneur
  (born 1995), Chinese actress, formerly known as Lamu Yangzi (辣目洋子) as stage name before September 2022
Nicky Li (born 1997), Chinese actress